Bəxtiyar Əlı oğlu Musayev (born 4 August 1973) is a retired Azerbaijani football midfielder.

He has played for Azerbaijan national team between 1997 and 2001, earning 18 caps.

National team statistics

References

1973 births
Living people
Soviet footballers
Azerbaijani footballers
FC Baku players
Qarabağ FK players
Khazar Lankaran FK players
MOIK Baku players
FK Shamkir players
Association football midfielders
Neftçi PFK players
Azerbaijan international footballers